John Francis McElhone (born 21 April 1963 in Glasgow, Scotland) is a Scottish guitarist and songwriter.

He has played with three bands who have enjoyed a top-20 presence in the UK Singles Chart; the new wave bands Altered Images and Hipsway, and the alternative/pop rock band Texas. Altered Images and Texas have had top-20 UK Albums Chart hits.

McElhone contributed the musical part of co-writing the bulk of Texas's material.

He is the son of Scottish Labour MPs Frank and Helen McElhone. He is the father of child actor Jack McElhone, who co-starred with Gerard Butler and Emily Mortimer in the 2004 film Dear Frankie.

References

External links
IMDb Biography
British Hit Singles - 14th Edition - 
The Guinness Book of British Hit Albums - 7th Edition - 
Guinness Rockopedia - 
The Great Rock Discography - 5th Edition - 

1963 births
Living people
Scottish bass guitarists
Musicians from Glasgow
Scottish new wave musicians
Scottish rock guitarists
Male bass guitarists
Scottish songwriters
People educated at Holyrood Secondary School
Texas (band) members